The following television stations broadcast on digital or analog channel 32 in Canada:

 CFSO-TV in Cardston, Alberta
 CHBC-DT-1 in Penticton, British Columbia
 CHCH-TV-6 in North Bay, Ontario
 CICO-DT-32 in Windsor, Ontario
 CIVK-DT-1 in Gascons, Quebec
 CIVT-DT in Vancouver, British Columbia
 CKCS-DT in Calgary, Alberta

32 TV stations in Canada